Labeo lukulae, the red-spot mudsucker, is a species of freshwater cyprinid fish in the genus Labeo. It is found in western Africa from Cameroon south to Angola. It is exploited for human consumption.

References 

Labeo
Fish described in 1902